Archer Peak  is a peak,  high, on the southwest extremity of Possession Island, Antarctica. It was named by the British Antarctic Expedition, 1898–1900, either for A. Archer, Esq., of Australia, mentioned in the preface to Carsten Borchgrevink's First on the Antarctic Continent, or for Colin Archer who designed Borchgrevink's vessel, the SS Southern Cross.

References

 

Mountains of Victoria Land
Borchgrevink Coast